Molonglo Reference Catalogue of Radio Sources (MRC) is an astronomical catalog containing 12,141 discrete sources from a 408-MHz survey with the Molonglo Radio Telescope.

References

Astronomical catalogues